Moyo Lawal born in Badagry town in Lagos state, Nigeria is a Nollywood actress. She won the award "Revelation of the year" at Best of Nollywood Awards in 2012.

Early life and education
Lawal was born in Badagry town and received primary, secondary, & tertiary education in Nigeria. She obtained her BSc degree in Creative Arts from the University of Lagos. She said she did not have children because it is hard work.

Career
Lawal began acting in small play productions when she had been convinced to venture into acting by a friend of hers whilst in school. She took part in the Next Movie Star Nigerian TV reality show but was unsuccessful in it.

Lawal debuted her first professional acting career in the TV series titled Shallow Waters in which she played the role of Chioma in the TV series. Lawal's career became more pronounced when she was able to secure herself a movie role in an award-winning TV series titled Tinsel where she played the notable role of a character named Chinny.

Lawal In the 2012 edition of Best of Nollywood Awards stylized as BON Awards won the award for Revelation of the Year.

Activism
Lawal who was a victim of an unsuccessful armed robbery attempt that occurred on third mainland bridge in Lagos, Nigeria has created awareness of the incident by narrating her ordeal and suggesting methods to curb incidences as such to avoid a reoccurrence. She further explained that creating awareness was the only solution as after narrating her ordeal, several other persons reached out to her explaining similar ordeals they encountered on the same route.

Awards and nominations

Selected filmography 
Holding Hope
A Time To Heal
A Toast To Heartbreak
Emem and Angie 
Madam’s PA 
Tangled Web 
Millenium Parent 
Desperate Baby Mama 
Parents’ Guard 
The Bridal Shower 
Big Gals on Campus
Cloud of Pain
Mistresses
Never Love a Prince
Thanks For Coming
Judas Game

TV series

Binta and Friends, 
Flatmates, 
Jenifa's Diary, 
Super Story, 
Edge of Paradise, 
Shallow Waters, 
Eldorado, and the award-winning TV series; 
Tinsel.

References

External links
Moyo Lawal IMDb Page

Living people
21st-century Nigerian actresses
Yoruba actresses
Year of birth missing (living people)
University of Lagos alumni
Nigerian film actresses
Nigerian television actresses
Nigerian film award winners